Walter Glacier is a glacier flowing east-northeast, merging with the south side of Moran Glacier to enter Schokalsky Bay, in the northeast portion of Alexander Island, Antarctica. The glacier was named by the Advisory Committee on Antarctic Names for Lieutenant Commander Howard J. Walter, U.S. Navy, LC-130 aircraft commander, Squadron VXE-6, Operation Deepfreeze, 1970 and 1971.

See also
 List of glaciers in the Antarctic
 Coulter Glacier
 Foreman Glacier
 Grotto Glacier

Glaciers of Alexander Island